Hales is a surname. Notable people with the surname include
 Alejandro Hales (1923-2001), Chilean politician
 Alex Hales (born 1989), English cricketer
 Alfred W. Hales (born 1938), American mathematician
 Charles Nicholas Hales (1935–2005), English physician
 Derek Hales (born 1951), English footballer
 E. E. Y. Hales (1908–1986), English historian
 James Hales (c. 1500–1554), English judge, son of above
 John Hales (disambiguation), any of various people of this name
 Laura Harris Hales (1967-2022), American historian and writer
 Robert Hales (disambiguation) any of various people of this name
 R. Stanton Hales (born 1942), American mathematician and educator
 Samuel Hales (1615–1693), founding settler of Hartford and Norwalk, Connecticut
 Stephen Hales (1677–1761), English physiologist, chemist and inventor
 Thomas Hales (disambiguation), any of various people of this name
 Hales, a Triballi king

Hayls
 John Hayls

See also
 Hales
 Hayles
 Hale (disambiguation)
 Hale's Ales, A Washington-based craft brewery